KIND is an AM radio station broadcasting on a frequency of 1010 kHz.  It is owned by My Town Media, Inc. and is licensed to Independence, Kansas.  My Town Media, Inc. is located in Pittsburg, Kansas.

The format is sports and is known as Fox Sports 1010 AM.

1010 AM is a Canadian clear-channel frequency, on which CFRB and CBR are the dominant Class A stations.

References

External links

IND (AM)
Pittsburg, Kansas